Days of Thunder is the soundtrack from the film of the same name, released in 1990 in the US by DGC Records, in Japan by CBS/Sony and internationally by Epic Records.

Background
"The Last Note of Freedom" was co-written by Hans Zimmer, Billy Idol and David Coverdale. 

Maria McKee's "Show Me Heaven" was released as a single alongside the movie and reached number one in the music charts of the UK, Belgium, the Netherlands and Norway.

The album is also notable for the inclusion of Guns N' Roses' cover of Bob Dylan's "Knockin' on Heaven's Door", a year before the song was released with a slightly different mix on the 1991 album Use Your Illusion II. The version recorded for the soundtrack featured these spoken word responses in the second verse, which are omitted from the later album recording:

Mama put my guns in the ground (It's wasn't their fault)
I can't shoot them anymore (How were they even supposed to know?)
That cold black cloud is coming down (All things can be healed in time)
Feels like I'm knockin' on Heaven's door (Why, why do which you're doing?)

The Cher song "Trail of Broken Hearts" was released as a B-side on the single "Love And Understanding" and belongs to the recording sessions of her 1989 album Heart of Stone. 

The song "Gimme Some Lovin'" is credited to Terry Reid, but the version in the movie is actually from The Spencer Davis Group.  "Gimme Some Lovin'" also featured on Reid's 1991 solo album, The Driver, along with an alternate version of "The Last Note of Freedom" with different lyrics, titled "The Driver (Part 2)".

Track listing
Side one
"The Last Note of Freedom" - David Coverdale
"Deal for Life" - John Waite
"Break Through the Barrier" - Tina Turner
"Hearts in Trouble" - Chicago
"Trail of Broken Hearts" - Cher
Side two
"Knockin' on Heaven's Door" - Guns N' Roses
"You Gotta Love Someone" - Elton John
"Show Me Heaven" - Maria McKee
"Thunder Box" - Apollo Smile
"Long Live the Night" - Joan Jett & The Blackhearts
"Gimme Some Lovin'" - Terry Reid (Spencer Davis Group version appears in movie)

Charts

Days of Thunder (score)

The film score to Days of Thunder was composed by Hans Zimmer and featured Jeff Beck on guitar. While bootlegs were available for years, an official album containing the score was not released until 2013, when La-La Land Records released the film's score, with bonus tracks, for the first time.

While looking back at the film's production, Zimmer said, “It was complete insanity, but again because it was [director Tony Scott] he’d just keep it recklessly fun.” Zimmer elaborated on this by explaining how the film's production was behind schedule and what originally was a day trip to meet with producers in Daytona turned into a three-month composing gig done inside a studio built within a warehouse.

Track listing
"Days of Thunder (Main Title)" (3:08)
"Rowdy Drives/Who Is This Driver?" (02:06)
"Let Me Drive/Cole Drives Rowdy's Car" (02:26)
"Car Building" (02:05)
"Darlington - Cole Wins" (04:47)
"You're Home/Daytona Race/The Crash" (03:29)
"The Hospital" (02:20)
"Wheelchair Race" (00:37)
"Rental Car Race" (03:50)
"Claire Arrives at her Apartment" (01:55)
"Physical Kiss" (01:05)
"Cole Blows His Engine" (01:10)
"Wheeler/Cole Smashes" (02:25)
"Cole at the Laundry/Cole Agrees to Drive Rowdy's Car" (02:11)
"Cole and Harry Fight/Harry Talks to Car" (02:52)
"Cole in Truck/Pre-Race" (03:52)
"The Last Race" (10:20)
"The Last Note of Freedom" (04:57) - David Coverdale
"The Hospital (Alternate)" (02:21)
"Wheelchair Race (Alternate)" (00:38)
"Claire Arrives at her Apartment (Alternate Ending)" (01:53)
"Cole Blows His Engine (Alternate) (01:12)
"Pre-Race (Alternate Mix)" (02:25)
"Days of Thunder (Main Title) (Rock Arrangement)" (04:59)

The last track, although marked as an alternate version of the main title, is in fact an instrumental version of "The Last Note of Freedom", with some studio outtakes of Jeff Beck performing parts of "Darlington - Cole Wins" and "The Last Race" at the end. The track also includes some studio chatter, presumably between Jeff Beck and editor Chris Lebenzon.

Personnel
 Hans Zimmer: Keyboards, Synthesizer, Programming [Fairlight CMI, Akai, Yamaha], Synclavier Programming
 John Van Tongeren: Keyboard Programming, Synthesizer Programming, Synthesized Bass, Bass Guitar
 Kirke Godfrey: Drum Programming, Percussion
 John Robinson: Drums
 Jeff Beck: Lead Guitar Solo
 Michael Thompson, Tim Pierce, Dean Parks: Additional Electric Guitars
 Paulinho Da Costa: Percussion
 Randy Jackson: Additional Bass Guitar
 Bruce Fowler: Additional Orchestrator
 Shirley Walker: Additional Orchestrator, Conductor
 Jay Rifkin: Score Mixer

References

1990 soundtrack albums
Epic Records soundtracks
Geffen Records soundtracks
La-La Land Records soundtracks
Action film soundtracks
Drama film soundtracks